Henodontidae is an extinct family of superficially turtle-like placodonts belonging to the superfamily Cyamodontoidea. Fossils have been found in Germany and Spain.

References

Placodonts
Prehistoric reptile families
Triassic sauropterygians
Late Triassic first appearances